Neomardara is a genus of moths in the subfamily Lymantriinae. The genus was described by Hering in 1926.

Species
Neomardara africana (Holland, 1893) Sierra Leone
Neomardara divergens Collenette, 1931 Zimbabwe

References

Lymantriinae